Aheri is a village in Anamab Rural Local Level Government area, Vanimo-Green River District, Sandaun Province in Papua New Guinea.

References

External links
 http://www.geonames.org/2101273/aheri.html

Populated places in Sandaun Province